Crona is a surname. Notable people with the surname include:

Beatrice Crona
Edvin Crona (born 2000), Swedish footballer
Görel Crona (born 1959), Swedish film director and actress

See also
 Cronay
 List of Soul Eater characters#Crona

Swedish-language surnames